Drakelow is a civil parish in South Derbyshire, England. The population of the civil parish including Caldwell, Derbyshire and Cauldwell, Derbyshire at the 2011 Census was 249. The statutory annual Drakelow Parish Meeting is announced on the Drakelow Community website

Geography and history 
Some of the land is lower flood plain but most occupies gentle slopes, all on the east bank of the River Trent.

Drakelow, whose name means 'Dragon's Mound', is mentioned in Domesday Book, but was deserted later during the Middle Ages. A chronicler at the nearby Burton Abbey, writing in the early twelfth century, claimed that this desertion took place because of supernatural events that had driven the residents away – specifically, attacks of two undead villagers from nearby Stapenhill.

Drakelowe Hall or Drakelow Hall was the principal residence, and was home to the Gresley Baronets, but this was replaced by Drakelow Power Station and in turn its last cooling towers were demolished in September 2006.

Drakelow Power Station
In 2005, the electricity company E.ON was given permission to build a new power station on the site of the previous. The proposed combined cycle gas turbine (CCGT) is rated at 1,200 MW, and would provide sufficient power for 1,000,000 homes.

Planning permission for upgraded plant as such to reopen a power station was granted in 2007, with a condition that combined heat and power capability would be built into the plant should a customer come forward that was economically viable. This consent was twice extended until October 2015, and a grid connection has been secured until 2014, as of November 2013.

See also
Listed buildings in Drakelow

References

Civil parishes in Derbyshire
South Derbyshire District